Argentina competed at the 1984 Summer Paralympics in Stoke Mandeville, Great Britain and New York City, United States. 6 competitors from Argentina won no medals and so did not place in the medal table.

See also 
 Argentina at the Paralympics
 Argentina at the 1984 Summer Olympics

References 

Nations at the 1984 Summer Paralympics